Cot a Queue verte is a synonym or alternative name to several wine grape varieties including:

Canari noir
Malbec
Mancin